Phantasis gigantea is a species of beetle in the family Cerambycidae. It was described by Félix Édouard Guérin-Méneville in 1844, originally under the genus Phrissoma.

References

Phantasini
Beetles described in 1844